Asha Bhosle (born 8 September 1933) is an Indian singer who has recorded numerous songs throughout her career. This is a complete list of awards and recognitions she has won.

Filmfare Awards
Asha Bhosle has won seven Filmfare Awards for Best Female Playback Singer out of 18 nominations. She won her first two awards in 1967 and 1968, when her elder sister Lata Mangeshkar still used to accept the award (Lata Mangeshkar asked not to be considered for the award nominations after 1969 to promote new talent.) After receiving the award in 1979, Asha Bhosle emulated her sister and requested that her name not be considered for the nominations hereafter. Despite this, she is the most frequent winner of this award to date, tying with Alka Yagnik. She was later given a Special Award for Rangeela in 1996, and the Filmfare Lifetime Achievement Award in 2001.

National Film Awards
National Film Award for Best Female Playback Singer - 1981 for "Dil Cheez Kya Hai" from Umrao Jaan

National Film Award for Best Female Playback Singer - 1987 for "Mera Kuch Samaan" from Ijaazat

Bengal Film Journalists' Association (BFJA) Award

Maharashtra State Film Awards
Asha Bhosle was the greatest playback singer in Marathi film industry.  She had sung maximum songs in Marathi language.  She was awarded "Maharashtra State Film Award for Best Female Playback Singer" a record 18 times.

Other Awards
1987 : Nightingale of Asia

1989 : Lata Mangeshkar Award by Madhya Pradesh Government

1997 : Grammy Award Nomination for Legacy with Ustad Ali Akbar Khan

1997 : Screen Videocon Award for Jaanam Samjha Karo

1997 : MTV Award for best playback singer for Jaanam Samjha Karo

1997 : Channel V Award for Jaanam Samjha Karo

1999 : Screen Award for Contribution to International Music

1999 : Lata Mangeshkar Award by Maharashtra Government

2000 : Singer Of the Millennium (Dubai)

2000 : Kolhapuri Bhushan Award

2000 : Sangli Bhushan Award

2000 : Omega Excellence Lifetime Achievement Award

2000 : Zee Gold Bollywood Award for Mujhe Rang De from Takshak

2001 : MTV Award for Kambakht Ishq

2001 : Dada Saheb Phalke Award

2001 : Dayawati Modi Award

2002 : Zee Cine - Hall Of Fame Award

2002 : Jeevan Gaurav Puraskar

2002 : Rajshree Shahu Puraskar

2002 : Zee Cine Award for Radha Kaise Na Jale from Lagaan

2002 : Screen Videocon Award for Radha Kaise Na Jale from Lagaan

2002 : Sansui Movie Award for Radha Kaise Na Jale from Lagaan

2002 : IIFA Award for Best Female Playback Singer

2002 : Star Screen Award for Best Female Playback Singer

2002 : BBC Lifetime Achievement Award (presented by the UK Prime Minister Tony Blair)

2003 : Swaralaya Yesudas Award for outstanding contributions to Indian music

2004 : Living Legend Award by the Federation of Indian Chamber of Commerce and Industry

2005 : MTV Immies, Best Female Pop Act for Aaj Jaane Ki Zid Na Karo.

2005 : Most Stylish People in Music

2008 : Padma Vibhushan Award

2011 : IIFA Life Time Achievement Award

2012 : 18th Annual Colour Screens Life Time Achievement Award

2012 : Mirchi Music Awards Lifetime Achievement Award

2013 : Pandit Hridaynath Lifetime Achievement Award

2014 : Music Living Legend Award by Global Indian Music Academy Awards (GiMA)

2014 : Lifetime Achievement Award for her contribution to Indian cinema at the Dubai International Film Festival (DIFF)

2018 : Yash Chopra Memorial Award

2018 : Deenanath Mangeshkar Award

2018: Banga Bhushan Award (Highest West Bengal Civilian Award)

2021: Maharashtra Bhushan Award

Honours & Recognitions

 Honorary Doctorates from the University Of Amravati & Jalgaon in Literature.

 Asha Bhosle is the recipient of the first Doctor of Literature (D.Litt.) of the Jodhpur National University.

 Asha Bhosle has also received the Freddie Mercury Award.

 Asha Bhosle has received the Sur Singar Award.

 The Birmingham Film Festival paid her a special tribute in November 2002.

 Asha Bhosle was among top 20 music icons of the past 50 years. 

 In 2011, The Guinness Book of World Records officially acknowledged Asha Bhosle, at The Asian Awards, as the most recorded artist in the history of music. She was awarded a certificate for "the most studio recordings (singles) from Sebastian Coe for recording up to 11,000 solo, duet and chorus-back songs and in over 20 Indian languages since 1943". At the event she was also awarded the Lifetime Achievement Award.

 Asha Bhosle is also the first Indian Singer to be nominated for the Grammy Award.

References

Lists of awards received by Indian musician